is a Japanese professional wrestler currently working as a freelancer and is best known for her tenure with the Japanese promotion Actwres girl'Z and her freelance appearances in promotions such as Oz Academy and Ice Ribbon. She is the current ICE Cross Infinity Champion in Ice Ribbon.

Professional wrestling career

Actwres girl'Z (2015–2019) 
Saori Anou debuted as a professional wrestler at the inaugural Actwres girl'Z show, AgZ Prologue on May 31, 2015. Until her departure from the company in December of 2019, Anou was one of AgZ's biggest and most important stars for the promotion. On November 15, 2018, Anou defeated SAKI in the finals of the AgZ Title Tournament and became the promotion's first champion. Anou would go on to lose the title to Reika Saiki on August 19, 2019. Anou would make two appearances in AgZ in 2021, including Act Yasukawa's return match.

Independent circuit (2015–present)
As a freelancer, Anou is known for competing in various promotions. At a house show hosted by Pure-J on October 9, 2017, she teamed up with Natsumi Maki and unsuccessfully challenged Command Bolshoi and Leon for the Daily Sports Tag Team Championship. At W-1 WRESTLE-1 Tour 2018 Autumn Bout, an event promoted by Wrestle-1 on November 1, 2018, Anou teamed up with Natsumi Maki in a losing effort to Hana Kimura and Asuka. At Seadlinnng Shin-Kiba 11th NIGHT on April 12, 2019, Anou teamed up with Miyuki Takase and Himeka Arita in a losing effort to Hiroyo Matsumoto, Makoto and Yoshiko. At Zero1 Super Fireworks, an event promoted by Pro Wrestling Zero1 on February 24, 2020, she teamed up with Mayumi Ozaki against Aja Kong and Hiroyo Matsumoto who was the Blast Queen Champion in a Super Plasma Blast Deathmatch which was also for the title but failed to capture it.

DDT Pro Wrestling (2017–present)
Anou has made sporadic appearances for DDT Pro Wrestling during the years. Her first match took place at DDT YAROZ Part 4 on February 14, 2017, where she defeated Tam Nakano. At DDT Live! Maji Manji #11 on July 10, 2018, she competed in an 7-person survival battle royal for the Ironman Heavymetalweight Championship also involving Konosuke Takeshita, Kudo, Toru Owashi, Masahiro Takanashi, Nobuhiro Shimatani and Saki Akai.

She also competed in signature events of the promotion such as DDT Peter Pan. On the first night of Wrestle Peter Pan 2020 on June 6, she teamed up with Hiroshi Yamato to defeat Haruka Kato and Keisuke Ishii.

Ice Ribbon (2017–present)
Anou is also makes appearances for Ice Ribbon. At New Ice Ribbon #974 on August 3, 2019, she teamed up with Maika Ozaki and unsuccessfully challenged Giulia and Tequila Saya for the International Ribbon Tag Team Championship. At New Ice Ribbon #1090 in December 31, 2020 Anou unsuccessfully challenged Suzu Suzuki for the ICE Cross Infinity Championship. On June 26, 2022, Anou defeated Yuuki Mashiro to win the vacant ICE Cross Infinity Championship.

Oz Academy (2017–present)
Anou is known for competing in Oz Academy. She made her first appearance in the promotion at OZ Academy Plum Hanasaku 2017 on August 20 where she teamed up with Command Bolshoi and Aoi Kizuki in a losing effort to Kaori Yoneyama, Rina Yamashita and Sakura Hirota as a result of a six-woman tag team match. When competing in the promotion, she is part of the Ozaki-gun stable. At OZ Academy You Might Think on October 7, 2018, she teamed up with stablemates Mayumi Ozaki and Yumi Ohka in a losing effort to Borderless (Rina Yamashita and Yoshiko) and Hikaru Shida. At Something is Happening Tonight on August 25, 2019, Anou teamed up with Maya Yukihi and defeated Beast Friend (Hiroyo Matsumoto and Kaori Yoneyama) to win the Oz Academy Tag Team Championship. At OZ Academy Plum Hanasaku 2020 ~ OZ No Kuni Buntai Final on August 28, 2020, she unsuccessfully challenged Mayumi Ozaki for the Oz Academy Openweight Championship.

World Wonder Ring Stardom (2015–2017)
Anou stepped into World Wonder Ring Stardom for a brief period of time. She is known for competing in various events such as the Goddesses of Stardom Tag League, making her first appearance at the 2016 edition where she teamed up with Hiromi Mimura, placing themselves in the Block A and scoring one point after facing the teams of Twisted Sisters (Thunder Rosa and Holidead), Santana Garrett and Chelsea Green, and Yoko Bito and Kairi Hojo. At Stardom Year-End Climax 2016 on December 22, she teamed up with Kaori Yoneyama in a losing effort to Natsuko Tora and Jungle Kyona and Oedo Tai (Hana Kimura and Kris Wolf) as a result of a three-way tag team match.

Championships and accomplishmentsActwres girl'ZAgZ Championship (1 time)
AgZ Championship Tournament (2018)Ice RibbonICE Cross Infinity Championship (1 time)DDT Pro-WrestlingIronman Heavymetalweight Championship (1 time)Oz AcademyOz Academy Tag Team Championship (1 time) – with Maya YukihiPro Wrestling Illustrated'' Ranked No. 87 of the top 150 female wrestlers in the PWI Women's 150 in 2022Pure-J'''
Princess of Pro-Wrestling Championship (1 time)

References 

1991 births
Living people
21st-century professional wrestlers
Japanese female professional wrestlers
People from Shiga Prefecture
Oz Academy Tag Team Champions
Ironman Heavymetalweight Champions